Selenodont teeth are the type of molars and premolars commonly found in ruminant herbivores.  They are characterized by low crowns, and crescent-shaped cusps when viewed from above (crown view). 

They differ from human molars in that the occlusal surface is not covered in enamel; rather, the layers of enamel, dentine, and cementum are all exposed, with cementum in the middle, surrounded by a layer of enamel, then a layer of dentine, all wrapped in a second outer layer of enamel.  

Viewed from the side, selenodont teeth form a series of triangular cusps. The combination of triangular profiles with ridges formed by the exposed layers makes the lateral chewing motion of ruminants an effective way to break-up tough vegetable matter.

References  

Types of teeth